The Take Off Merlin is a German ultralight trike, designed and produced by Take Off GmbH of Hamm. The aircraft is supplied as a complete ready-to-fly-aircraft.

Design and development
The aircraft features a cable-braced hang glider-style high-wing, weight-shift controls, a two-seats-in-tandem open cockpit with a cockpit fairing, tricycle landing gear with wheel pants and a single engine in pusher configuration.

The aircraft is made from welded stainless steel tubing, with its double surface wing covered in Dacron sailcloth. Its  span wing is supported by a single tube-type kingpost and uses an "A" frame weight-shift control bar. The powerplants are various BMW motorcycle engines that vary by model.

A number of different wings can be fitted to the basic carriage, including the Drachen Studio Avent and Air Creation iXess .

Variants
Merlin 100
Initial version introduced in 1994
Merlin 1100
Model introduced in 1998 and powered by a four-stroke,  BMW 1100 RS engine.
Merlin 1200
Model introduced in 2006 and powered by a four-stroke,  BMW 1200 GS engine.

Specifications (Merlin 1200)

References

External links

1990s German sport aircraft
1990s German ultralight aircraft
Single-engined pusher aircraft
Ultralight trikes
High-wing aircraft
Aircraft first flown in 1994